James Medbury MacKaye (April 8, 1872 – January 22, 1935) was an American engineer and philosopher.

Biography

MacKaye was born in New York City, the son of actor Steele MacKaye and Mary (Medbery) MacKaye, and brother of poet Percy MacKaye, theater professional and suffragist Hazel MacKaye and conservationist Benton MacKaye.  He attended Grammar School No. 40 near Groton, Massachusetts and Packard's Business College in New York, and in 1895 obtained an SB degree from Harvard University.  In early 1890 MacKaye worked as a patent lawyer with the Census Bureau in Washington, and in April 1891 he became secretary to Nathaniel Southgate Shaler at the Harvard Geological Department, holding for a number of years various minor appointments in that institution.  He joined the Boston firm Stone & Webster in 1899, where he worked as a research engineer.  During the 28 years that he remained affiliated to that company he published several books on ethics, economics and politics, including Americanized Socialism, The Logic of Conduct and, most notably, The Economy of Happiness.

The Economy of Happiness

In this highly original but now largely forgotten work, MacKaye attempted to rescue the utilitarianism of Jeremy Bentham from the changes that this doctrine had subsequently undergone as a result of John Stuart Mill's moderating influence.  MacKaye conceived human beings—and sentient beings generally—as mechanisms of transforming resources into happiness, which he argued was the only intrinsic good.  The goal of a society was therefore viewed by MacKaye as the problem of finding that arrangement which would produce the highest output of happiness attainable given the inputs available. As he wrote,

MacKaye concluded that the form of social organization most conducive to that goal was a particular type of socialism which he dubbed "pantocracy".

The Dynamic Universe

In 1930 MacKaye startled the world after announcing an alternative to Albert Einstein's general theory of relativity.  His theory of "radiation" was first presented at the twenty-ninth annual meeting of the American Philosophical Association held at Columbia University.  Contrary to Einstein, MacKaye proposed a dynamic universe, assuming that all space was filled with radiation of super-frequency and super-penetration moving in all directions with the speed of light.   As he claimed in the concluding paragraph of his paper, subsequently published in The Journal of Philosophy, "If the radiation theory is sound, [...] it is plain that Einstein has discovered nothing about time, space, motion or acceleration unknown to the Newtonians, or shown that what they have hitherto assumed about those magnitudes is contrary to any fact in nature." The theory was described as "magnificent" by William Pepperell Montague and appears to have been generally well received by the audience.  He later expanded his views in the book, The Dynamic Universe, published in 1931.

MacKaye entered the academic profession only in 1931, when he became a lecturer at Rollins College.  The following year he was appointed Professor of Philosophy at Dartmouth College.  At the end of 1934 MacKaye was hospitalized at the Massachusetts General Hospital in Boston, where he had a gall bladder surgery.  Although the doctors predicted recovery, he died a week later.  A service was held on January 24 at the Memorial Church of Harvard University, where his remains were cremated.

Bibliography

 The Economy of Happiness, Boston: Little, Brown, and Co., 1906.
 The Happiness of Nations: A Beginning in Political Engineering, New York: B.W. Huebsch, 1915.
 The Mechanics of Socialism, Boston: Fabian Club, 1915.
 Americanized Socialism; A Yankee View of Capitalism, New York: Boni and Liveright, 1918.
 The Science of Usefulness, New York: Boni and Liveright, 1920.
 The Logic of Conduct, New York: Boni and Liveright, 1924.
 Thoreau: Philosopher of Freedom, New York: Vanguard Press, 1930
 The Dynamic Universe, New York: C. Scribner's Sons, 1931
 The Logic of Language, Hanover, N.H.: Dartmouth College Publications, 1939.

References

External links

James MacKaye. WorldCat Identities.

1872 births
1935 deaths
American non-fiction writers
Harvard University alumni
Relativity critics